Furnace Room Lullaby is the second studio album by Neko Case and Her Boyfriends, released in February 2000, on Mint Records.

Said Case of the title track at a performance at Austin City Limits in 2003, "I wanted to write a murder ballad, simply because I was such a huge fan of the Louvin Brothers.  Not that this song is anywhere as good as a Louvin Brothers song, but I tried."

Guest musicians on the album include Scott Betts, Brian Connelly, Bob Egan, Dallas Good and Travis Good, Kelly Hogan, Evan Johns, Kevin Kane, Don Kerr, Linda McRae, Darryl Neudorf, Carl Newman, Ford Pier, John Ramberg, Henri Sangalang, Ron Sexsmith and Joel Trueblood.

The title track was included on the soundtrack to Sam Raimi's film The Gift.

Track listing

Personnel
Credits sourced from Furnace Room Lullabys liner notes.

Neko Case & Her Boyfriends
 Neko Case - vocals; tambourine , harmony vocals 
 Kelly Hogan - backing vocals , spooky ooh's 
 Travis Good - baritone guitar , electric guitar , acoustic guitar , mandolin , tenor guitar , fiddle , 8-string guitar , upright bass

Chart positions

References

Neko Case albums
2000 albums
Mint Records albums
Bloodshot Records albums
Loose Music albums
Albums produced by Darryl Neudorf

External links